Phago is a genus of distichodontid freshwater fishes found in tropical West and Middle Africa. They are specialized fin-eaters, but may on occasion also feed on insects and (whole) fish.

Species
, it consists of the following three species:
 Phago boulengeri Schilthuis, 1891
 Phago intermedius Boulenger, 1899
 Phago loricatus Günther, 1865 (African pike-characin)

References

Further reading
 
 

Distichodontidae
Fish of Africa
Taxa named by Albert Günther